Cornufer punctatus, commonly known as the dotted wrinkled ground frog, is a species of frog in the family Ceratobatrachidae. It is endemic to Western New Guinea (Indonesia) and occurs in the Arfak and Wondiwoi Mountains in the Guinean mainland well as on some adjacent islands (Batanta and Waigeo).

Description
Dorsal skin is relatively smooth, apart from the supratympanic fold. The fingers and the toes bear enlarged and grooved discs. The toes are one-third to one-half webbed. In preserved specimens, the dorsal surfaces are almost patternless dark brown. The facial area is darker brown and has broad, vertical bars on the upper lip that become less distinct on the lower lip. The sides of the body are lightly mottled and the groin is more heavily mottled. Much finer mottling is present on the posterior surfaces of the thighs, whereas the under sides of the tibias are heavily mottled. Other ventral surfaces are pale and nearly patternless, apart from the faint grayish mottling on the chin.

Habitat and conservation
Platymantis punctatus occurs in rainforest at elevations below , usually near streams. Development is direct, without free-living tadpole stage.

Platymantis punctatus is a not a common species. No overall threats to it are unknown, although logging can impact it locally. Its range includes Wandamen Nature Reserve and Batanta Nature Reserve.

References

punctatus
Endemic fauna of Indonesia
Amphibians of Western New Guinea
Taxa named by Giacomo Doria
Taxa named by Wilhelm Peters
Amphibians described in 1878
Taxonomy articles created by Polbot